Pavel Musil (born 30 August 1992) is a Czech professional ice hockey player. He currently plays for HC Škoda Plzeň in the Czech Extraliga.

Musil made his Czech Extraliga debut playing with HC Pardubice during the 2013–14 Czech Extraliga season.

References

External links

1992 births
Living people
Czech ice hockey forwards
HC Dynamo Pardubice players
HC Olomouc players
HC Plzeň players
People from Čáslav
Sportspeople from the Central Bohemian Region
BK Havlíčkův Brod players
BK Mladá Boleslav players